The Observatory Vsetín was found in 1950 by the local branch of Czechoslovak Astronomical Society.

Brief history

Scientific equipment 

 Main telescope (refractore, focal distance 3 000 mm, diameter 200 mm), popularization of astronomy, night observation for public, observation of Sun
 Guiding telescope (refractore, focal distance 2 800 mm, diameter 120 mm), not in use
 View finder (refractore, diameter 90 mm) both comets photometry and night observation for public
 BlackPearl (Newton, focal distance 1 200 mm, diameter 150 mm), comets photometry,  retired in July 2008
 Newton (Newton-type reflector, focal distance 1 700 mm, diameter of primary mirror 300 mm), comets photometry
 CCD camera SBIG-ST7, comets photometry, possibly astrometry

Scientific activities 

 CCD comets photometry
 Lightning detection
 Research of severe storms
 Bulletin ATHENA

Popularization activities

Directors 
 Oldřich Křenek from July 1950 to January 1955
 Tomáš Skandera from January 1955 to May 1971
 Josef Blažek from May 1971 to January 1973
 Jiří Haas from January 1973 to present

See also
 List of astronomical observatories

References

External links
 Official web of Observatory Vsetín (only Czech)

Vsetin
1950 establishments in Czechoslovakia
20th-century architecture in the Czech Republic